Stuart James Roberts (born 22 March 1965) is a former New Zealand cricketer who played two One Day Internationals in 1990.

References

1965 births
Living people
New Zealand One Day International cricketers
New Zealand cricketers
Canterbury cricketers